Semmes  (pronounced , locally ) is a city in western Mobile County, Alabama, in the Mobile metropolitan area. It was incorporated in 2011. As of the 2020 census, the population was 4,941.

History 
The community was named for Admiral Raphael Semmes (1809–1877), an officer in the United States Navy from 1826 to 1860 and the Confederate States Navy from 1860 to 1865.

Incorporation 
On March 3, 2010, the members of the Friends of Semmes and the associated Incorporate Semmes organizations presented Mobile County Probate Judge Don Davis with a petition seeking to incorporate an area within the Semmes community as the City of Semmes. The proposed incorporation did not include the entire area known as Semmes due to certain population density requirements of Alabama state law. Judge Davis set the date for the referendum as Tuesday, August 17, 2010. After voting closed, unofficial returns showed the plebiscite passing with 74.19% of the voters in favor of incorporation. Some voters complained about the "zig-zag" nature of the proposed city limits, which excluded some areas of the community from the vote, with some referring to the proposed city as a gerrymander.

Once the election was certified in August, the Mobile County Probate Judge ordered an enumeration, or census, of the citizens of the new municipality, in accordance with Alabama law. The enumeration was completed in late April 2011, and the city was declared incorporated by the Probate Judge on May 2, 2011. The Probate Judge set the date of the first municipal election to be June 28, 2011, to elect the mayor and the five at-large city council seats. The city of Mobile, upon the issuance of the order of incorporation, removed Semmes from its police, fire, and planning extraterritorial jurisdictions, and no longer provides any services or collects any taxes in the area.

Only one person, Judy Hale, filed with the Probate Judge to run for the office of Mayor, and, as such, was deemed elected without an election taking place. Likewise, only five citizens qualified to run for the five at-large City Council seats, and were subsequently deemed elected. The council members were Jerry Shirey, Dave Baker, Mary Calhoun, Phillip Dodd, and Teresa Bonner. They took the oath of office at the first Semmes City Council meeting on June 6, 2011. 

The current mayor of Semmes is Brandon Van Hook, a local business owner. He was elected in August 2020 and replaced incumbent Mayor David Baker who only served one term.

Future 
Leaders of the incorporation effort stated to members of the local media and to some citizens not included in the incorporation area that future plans included several annexations of the surrounding area.

Geography 
U.S. Route 98 (Moffett Road) is the main highway through Semmes, leading southeast into Mobile and northwest  to Hattiesburg, Mississippi.

Climate 
Semmes is on the central Gulf Coast and has a subtropical climate, which consists of warm, wet winters and very hot, very humid summers. Semmes is also vulnerable to hurricanes, which the area frequently experiences.

Demographics

2020 census

As of the 2020 United States census, there were 4,941 people, 2,243 households, and 1,446 families residing in the city.

Education

Primary and secondary education 
Semmes is a part of the Mobile County Public Schools system.
 Secondary
 Mary G. Montgomery High School (9-12)
 Semmes Middle School (6-8)
 Primary (all K-5)
 Semmes Elementary
 Allentown Elementary

Elementary schools serving nearby areas outside of the city limits:
 Elsie Collier Elementary School
 Tanner Williams Elementary School
 Turner Elementary

Private schools:
 Semmes First Baptist School
 Faith Academy (Mobile)
 Day Star Christian Academy (Wilmer)

Higher education 
Semmes is in proximity to five tertiary institutions:
 Bishop State Community College
 Faulkner University, Mobile Campus
 Spring Hill College
 University of Mobile
 University of South Alabama

Parks

Community park 
The first community park in Semmes opened on February 3, 2007. The  park was built adjacent to the Semmes Community Center at a cost of $600,000.

Semmes Heritage Park 
Semmes School is the oldest continuously in-use school in the state of Alabama and is listed as an Alabama Historical Landmark. In 1994, a group of volunteers, former students, teachers and community citizens formed "Alumni & Friends of Semmes School, Inc." to preserve the 1902 one-room Semmes School and return it to its original location. The Mobile County School Board had planned to tear down the school when concerned citizens formed a group to save to school. The School Board gave a 99-year lease to the group and moved the school back to its original site. The school was restored to its 1902 status in 1998 by volunteers and donations, and continues to operate with volunteers as a hands-on 1900s school. Malone Chapel is a replica of Mt. Pleasant Church that was located on this exact spot. The chapel is rented for weddings and special events with the funds going towards operational expenses.

Notable people
 Jake Peavy, MLB pitcher
 Ralph Staten, NFL player

References

External links 
 

Cities in Mobile County, Alabama
Cities in Alabama
Populated places established in 2011